The 1969 Chicago White Sox season was the team's 69th season in the major leagues, and its 70th season overall. They finished with a record of 68–94, good enough for fifth place in the newly established American League West, 29 games behind the first-place Minnesota Twins.

The White Sox nearly left Chicago in 1969. White Sox owner Arthur Allyn, Jr. considered overtures from Bud Selig and other Milwaukee interests to move the club to County Stadium. Instead, he sold to his brother, John. The newly established Seattle Pilots would move there a year after their inaugural season.

Offseason 
 October 15, 1968: Hoyt Wilhelm was drafted from the White Sox by the Kansas City Royals as the 49th pick in the 1968 MLB expansion draft.
 December 5, 1968: Jack Fisher was traded by the White Sox to the Cincinnati Reds for Don Pavletich and Don Secrist.

Regular season

Season standings

Record vs. opponents

Opening Day lineup 
 Luis Aparicio, SS
 Carlos May, LF
 Bill Melton, 3B
 Gail Hopkins, 1B
 Duane Josephson, C
 Buddy Bradford, RF
 Ken Berry, CF
 Sandy Alomar Sr., 2B
 Gary Peters, P

Move to Milwaukee? 
In 1969, the White Sox schedule in Milwaukee was expanded to include 11 home games (one against every other franchise in the American League at the time). Although those games were attended by slightly fewer fans (198,211 fans, for an average of 18,019) they represented a greater percentage of the total White Sox attendance than the previous year – over one-third of the fans who went to Sox home games in 1969 did so at Milwaukee County Stadium (in the remaining 70 home dates in Chicago, the Sox drew 391,335, for an average of 5,591 per game). Bud Selig felt this fan support lent legitimacy to his quest for a Milwaukee franchise, and he went into the 1969 owners meetings with high hopes.

Notable transactions 
 May 14, 1969: Sandy Alomar Sr. and Bob Priddy were traded by the White Sox to the California Angels for Bobby Knoop.
 June 5, 1969: Rich Hinton was drafted by the White Sox in the 3rd round of the 1969 Major League Baseball draft (Secondary Phase).

Roster

Player stats

Batting 
Note: G = Games played; AB = At bats; R = Runs scored; H = Hits; 2B = Doubles; 3B = Triples; HR = Home runs; RBI = Runs batted in; BB = Base on balls; SO = Strikeouts; AVG = Batting average; SB = Stolen bases

Pitching 
Note: W = Wins; L = Losses; ERA = Earned run average; G = Games pitched; GS = Games started; SV = Saves; IP = Innings pitched; H = Hits allowed; R = Runs allowed; ER = Earned runs allowed; HR = Home runs allowed; BB = Walks allowed; K = Strikeouts

Farm system 

LEAGUE CHAMPIONS: Appleton, Duluth-Superior

Notes

References 
 1969 Chicago White Sox at Baseball Reference

Chicago White Sox seasons
Chicago White Sox season
Chicago